Albinaria corrugata is a species of air-breathing land snails, terrestrial pulmonate gastropod molluscs in the family Clausiliidae, the door snails.

Distribution 
This species occurs in:
 Greece

Description

References

External links 

 http://www.animalbase.uni-goettingen.de/zooweb/servlet/AnimalBase/home/species?id=416

Albinaria
Gastropods described in 1792